Nikol Duman,  born Nikoghayos Ter-Hovhannisyan (12 January 1867 – 23 September 1914), was an Armenian fedayee from Karabakh.

Early life
Nikoghayos Ter-Hovhannisyan was born to an Armenian family in the Ghshlagh village of Nagorno-Karabakh. His father was a priest. In 1887, he graduated from the Shushi diocesan school. He then taught in Armenian schools in the North Caucasus until 1891, when he moved to Tabriz, where he was a teacher and also the treasurer of the circle of local Armenian national figures.

Beginning in 1893, he taught at the school in the village of Galasar, Salmas (modern Iran, near the border with Turkey), where he took an active part in the Armenian national and political life as a member of the Union of Armenian revolutionaries (later the Armenian Revolutionary Federation). Nikol was one of the three members of the committee ARF in Tabriz, along with Ovnanom Davtyan and Hovsep Arghutian.

Active armed movement
After the Hamidian massacres of Armenians from 1894 to 1896, Nikol entirely devoted himself to the Armenian national liberation movement and organization of self-defense.
 
In 1895, he moved to Van with a group of 10 people. His house was besieged by the Kurdish Hamidiye cavalry. Although the Kurds had set fire to his house, Nikol managed to escape under the cover of smoke and went to the nearby mountains, where he and his men firing back and killed two Hamidiye. Admiring his courage, the Kurds nicknamed him "Duman" ("Storm").
 
He was arrested in Van, but soon released.
 
Duman was the initiator of the 1897 Khanasor Expedition, an attack on the Kurdish Mazrik tribe and its commander Sharaf Beg for their role in the Hamidian massacres and ambush at Van, and took part in the campaign as a squad leader. The attack began on 25 July 1897 and ended on 27 July 1897. All of the men in the tribe were killed and only the women and children were spared, a mercy the Turks and Kurds never gave the Armenians. Sharaf Beg managed to escape.
 
Afterward, Duman moved back to the Russian Empire, in Tiflis. During the 1904 Sasun uprising, he is tried to get his men to Sason, but was unable to.
 
At the beginning of the Armenian-Tatar massacres in February 1905, he was hastily called by telegram to Baku, where he organized a self-defense and, on 7 February, had successfully arrived to fight against Tatars. Duman was then appointed head of the self-defense of Erivan region. He was an advocate of the liberation of Western Armenia and proposed a general uprising. He took part in the Dashnak party congresses, and in 1910, was present at the Second Copenhagen International Congress.

Following the Young Turk Revolution of 1908, he led operations in Van, Erzurum and Trabzon. He also took part in the Persian Constitutional Revolution, leading the Dashnak party during the defense of Tabriz.

Death
In 1914, he became ill with tuberculosis and went for treatment in Kislovodsk. At the same time, the First World War was beginning. Feeling that he would not be able to participate with the other Armenian fedayi, Duman committed suicide with a pistol shot on the evening of 23 September 1914. He was buried in Tbilisi, at the Armenian Pantheon of Tbilisi, next to the grave of one of the founders of the Armenian Revolutionary Federation, Simon Zavarian.

Legacy

A house museum dedicated to the life of Nikol Duman is located in Nagorno-Karabakh, in the village of Ghshlagh, Nagorno-Karabakh Republic.

Several cities in Armenia contain streets named after Nikol Duman.

References

External links

Official house museum website

1867 births
1914 deaths
Armenian nationalists
People from Askeran Province
Armenian fedayi
Armenian military personnel who committed suicide
Russian people of Armenian descent
Armenian expatriates in Iran
People of the Persian Constitutional Revolution
Burials at Armenian Pantheon of Tbilisi
1914 suicides